Arthur Ashe defeated Tom Okker in the final, 14–12, 5–7, 6–3, 3–6, 6–3 to win the men's singles tennis title at the 1968 U.S. Open. Ashe became the first African-American man to win a major.

It was the first edition of the tournament open to professional players, a period in tennis history known as the Open Era.

John Newcombe was the defending champion, but lost in the quarterfinals to Clark Graebner.

Seeds
The seeded players are listed below. Arthur Ashe is the champion; others show the round in which they were eliminated.

  Rod Laver (fourth round)
  Tony Roche (fourth round)
  Ken Rosewall (semifinals)
  John Newcombe (quarterfinals)
  Arthur Ashe (champion)
  Dennis Ralston (quarterfinals)
  Clark Graebner (semifinals)
  Tom Okker (finals)
 n/a
  Andrés Gimeno (first round)
  Fred Stolle (second round)
  Charlie Pasarell (third round)
  Richard Pancho Gonzales (quarterfinals)
  Roy Emerson (fourth round)
  Marty Riessen (second round)
  Cliff Drysdale (quarterfinals)

Draw

Key
 Q = Qualifier
 WC = Wild card
 LL = Lucky loser
 r = Retired

Final eight

Section 1

Section 2

Section 3

Section 4

Section 5

Section 6

Section 7

Section 8

References

External links
 Association of Tennis Professionals (ATP) – 1968 US Open Men's Singles draw
1968 US Open – Men's draws and results at the International Tennis Federation

US Open (tennis) by year – Men's singles
M